The 2008–09 FA Cup (known as The FA Cup sponsored by E.ON for sponsorship reasons) was the 128th season of the world's oldest football knockout competition; the FA Cup. A record 762 clubs were accepted for the competition; one club, South Normanton Athletic, folded before the fixtures were released, leaving 761 clubs to appear in the draw. Two more clubs, Brierley Hill & Withymoor and Stapenhill, folded after the draws for the early rounds were made, giving their opponents a walkover.

The competition started on 16 August 2008 with the Extra Preliminary Round and concluded on 30 May 2009 with the Final, held at Wembley Stadium. Because winners Chelsea qualified for the 2009–10 UEFA Champions League by finishing 3rd in the 2008–09 Premier League, losing finalists Everton qualified for the play-off round of the 2009–10 UEFA Europa League. Because Everton also happened to qualify for a Europa League berth by finishing 5th in the Premier League, that berth was awarded to the 6th place team (Aston Villa), whose berth (which was available because 2009–10 Football League Cup winners Manchester United qualified for the Champions League as Premier League winners) was in turn awarded to the 7th place team (Fulham).

This season's competition saw the beginning of a new television contract for the tournament, with ITV and Setanta Sports taking over the domestic rights from the BBC and Sky Sports.

Calendar

Qualifying rounds

All of the teams that entered the competition, but were not members of the Premier League or The Football League, had to compete in the qualifying rounds.

First round proper
All of the 24 League One and 24 League Two teams entered at this round, along with the winners of the previous round, the fourth qualifying round. These 32 winners came from the following levels:

14 teams from Level 5 (Conference National)
9 from Level 6: 5 Conference North, 4 Conference South
6 from Level 7: 1 Northern Premier League, 2 Southern League, 3 Isthmian League
2 from Level 8: Curzon Ashton of the NPL North and Bury Town of the Southern League Midland
1 from Level 9: Leiston of the Eastern Counties League Premier Division

The draw took place on 26 October 2008. The matches were played between 7 and 9 November 2008.

† – After extra time

‡ – Grays' replay with Carlisle was abandoned the first time it was played after 20 minutes because of floodlight failure with Grays leading 1–0.

Blyth Spartans, Droylsden and Histon beat teams from two levels higher. Kettering Town were the fourth non-league team to beat a league club. Curzon Ashton were the only club to beat a team from four levels higher, beating Exeter City.

Second round proper
The draw was held on 9 November 2008 and involved the 40 winning teams from the previous round. These were from the following levels:

13 from Level 3 (League One)
14 from Level 4 (League Two)
7 from Level 5 (Conference National)
4 from Level 6 (all Conference North)
1 from Level 7 (Eastwood Town of the Northern Premier League Premier Division)
1 from Level 8 (Curzon Ashton of the Northern Premier League North)

The draw was conducted by Lawrie Sanchez and Ray Parlour. Matches in the Second Round Proper were played over the weekend of 29 November 2008, with the exception of the match between Crewe Alexandra and Carlisle United, which was played on 2 December, due to the abandonment of the first-round game between Carlisle United and Grays Athletic.

† – After extra time

‡ – Droylsden's first visit to Chesterfield was abandoned at half time due to fog. The first replay, two weeks later, was then abandoned after 70 minutes due to floodlight failure.

6 non-league clubs beat league clubs: Leeds United lost to Histon, while League Two clubs lost to Eastwood Town, Blyth Spartans, Barrow, Forest Green Rovers and Kettering Town.

Third round proper
The draw was held on 30 November 2008. The draw was carried out by Sir Trevor Brooking and Ray Clemence at Soho Square. The 20 Premier League and 24 Championship teams enter at this stage, along with the 20 winners from the previous round. These 20 teams came from the following levels:

9 from Level 3 (League One)
3 from Level 4 (League Two)
6 from Level 5 (Conference National)
1 from Level 6 (Blyth Spartans of the Conference North)
1 from Level 7 (Eastwood Town of the Northern Premier League Premier Division)

The matches were played between 2 and 5 January 2009, with the exception of the ties between Birmingham City and Wolverhampton Wanderers, Histon and Swansea City, Cheltenham Town and Doncaster Rovers, and Leyton Orient and Sheffield United, which were postponed until 13 January 2009.

† – After extra time

Torquay United were the only team to beat a team from three levels higher, while Hartlepool United were the only team to beat a team from two levels higher.

Fourth round proper
The draw was held on 4 January 2009. It comprised teams from the following levels:

15 from the Premier League
13 from the Championship
2 from League One
0 from League Two
2 from the Conference National

The draw was conducted by Roberto Di Matteo and Dave Beasant. Most of the matches were played on the weekend of 24 January 2009.

A technical error during ITV's broadcast of the Everton–Liverpool replay meant that millions of viewers missed Dan Gosling's winner for Everton late in extra time. Coverage of the match was temporarily interrupted by advertisements, only for viewers to see Everton's players celebrating upon the restoration of the feed. ITV received thousands of complaints about the mistake, with many viewers questioning ITV's ability to broadcast live football, especially given their £275 million contract with The Football Association. ITV has subsequently apologised for the error.

† – After extra time

Fifth Round Proper
The draw was held on 25 January 2009. It comprised ten teams from the Premier League and six from the Championship, and was conducted by Gary Mabbutt and Gary Pallister. The Fifth round matches were played on the weekend of 14 February 2009, with the exception of the tie between Arsenal and Burnley, after Arsenal's Fourth round replay with Cardiff City was postponed due to snow. The match was played on 8 March 2009.

Sixth Round Proper
The draw was held on 15 February 2009. It comprised seven teams from the Premier League and Coventry City from the Championship. It was conducted by Frank McLintock and Graeme Souness. The matches were played on the weekend of 7 March 2009, with the exception of the tie between Arsenal and Hull City, which was played on 17 March.

Semi-finals
The draw was held on 8 March 2009, and was conducted by Bob Wilson and Joe Royle. The semi-final matches were played at Wembley Stadium, on the weekend of 18 April 2009. Unlike the previous rounds, replays were not held if a match ended as a draw; if necessary, extra time was added and a penalty shoot-out was held immediately after the match.

Final

Top scorers

Media coverage
In the United Kingdom, ITV regained the free to air broadcasting rights from the BBC who held on to it after seven seasons while Setanta Sports took over the subscription broadcasting rights from Sky Sports who held on to it for 20 seasons.

International broadcasters

References

External links
The FA Cup at thefa.com

 
FA Cup seasons
FA Cup
FA Cup